The Long Island Rail Road (LIRR) is a commuter railway system serving all four counties of Long Island, with one station in the Manhattan borough of New York City in the U.S. state of New York. Its operator is the Metropolitan Transportation Authority of New York. Serving 301,763 passengers per day as of 2007 and 88.5 million riders for the year of 2008, it is the busiest commuter railroad in the United States. With 324 passenger route-miles, it spans Long Island from Atlantic Terminal in Brooklyn to Montauk station at the tip of the southern fork. Pennsylvania Station in Manhattan is the actual westernmost station of the Long Island Rail Road and its busiest station.

The system currently has 126 stations on eleven rail lines called "branches". (Not included in this count are two additional stations that serve employees of the LIRR:  and ). The six stations on the Main Line east of Ronkonkoma get very limited week-round trains, and are often used for recreation rather than commuting.  is a major transfer station between branches, as it provides the interchange from the eastern Long Island stations to the western New York terminals and vice versa. The ,  and  stations provide transfers between electric train service and diesel train service within their respective branches, the Port Jefferson, Ronkonkoma/Greenport and Babylon/Montauk branches.

Lines 
This list shows the western and eastern terminals of each LIRR service. There are 10 total services, plus one additional seasonal service (the Belmont Park Branch).  and the two employees-only stations are not included in the station counts below.

Trunk lines
The LIRR has three trunk lines; each branch begins eastbound trips out of New York City via one of these lines.

Station types and designs 
The Long Island Rail Road has four types of station designs:
Ground level (most common, platforms accessible via ramps and/or staircases)
Elevated (all Babylon Branch stations and select others)
Open-cut (select Port Washington Branch stations)
Additionally, some stations have station houses ("staffed", if open), whereas others do not ("unstaffed", if there is none or if the office is closed). Some stations with station houses have ticketing offices open either part-time or full-time, whereas others do not have open ones. Additionally, some stations that lack station houses used to have them; these station houses were razed.

Station house designs 
The LIRR has an amalgam of different station house designs across its system. Many station houses built during the same time period (e.g., Mineola and Manhasset; 1920s), or as part of the same project (e.g., Central Islip and Deer Park; 1987 Hicksville–Ronkonkoma electrification project), share similar or identical designs.

Platform lengths 

Below are a sample of various stations with different platform lengths throughout the system:

 Glen Street, located on the Oyster Bay Branch, has two side platforms, each -cars-long.
 Pinelawn, located on the Ronkonkoma Branch, has two side platforms, each 2-cars-long.
 Westwood, located on the West Hempstead Branch, has one side platform, which is 4-cars-long.
 Hampton Bays, located on the Montauk Branch, has one side platform, which is 6-cars-long.
 Hempstead, the terminus of the Hempstead Branch, has two sets of island platforms, each 8-cars-long.
 Woodmere, located on the Far Rockaway Branch, has two side platforms, each 10-cars-long.
 Northport, located on the Port Jefferson Branch, has one side platform, which is 12-cars-long.
 Bellmore, located on the Babylon Branch, has one island platform, which is 14-cars-long.

Historical preservation of stations

The  and  stations are contributing properties to NRHP districts. Efforts to save the original  station house in 2004 were unsuccessful when the structure was found to be too unstable, while the demolition of 's in 1965 brought public outcry throughout the Hamptons as well as among local railfans that has lasted for decades.

The  station house, built in 1873, is the oldest such building constructed by the LIRR that remains standing. 's station house is older, but it was originally built by the South Side Railroad of Long Island in 1870. On the West Hempstead Branch, 's station house is the only one originally built during the first two decades of the 20th century, although it is not recognized as a historic landmark. The elaborate  station house was one of the few to avoid modernization during the mid-to-late 20th century and has retained the original grand decorative construction. When the Babylon Branch was elevated in the post-WWII era, former station houses in Wantagh and Lindenhurst were moved away from the tracks. The former Wantagh station was transformed into a museum, and also listed on the NRHP.

List of stations
This list contains all stations currently open on the Long Island Rail Road, including seasonal-use stations. Lines with colored boxes indicate branches which serve the station, while lines in parentheses indicate the physical line the station is located on, if applicable. For example, Amityville is physically located on the Montauk Branch but is served by Babylon Branch trains and only appears in the latter timetable.

Disused and former stations 

These stations are either demolished or existing but not currently in use by the Long Island Rail Road. Several stations of the Rockaway Beach Branch and Far Rockaway Branch were taken over by the New York City Subway as the IND Rockaway Line in 1956.

See also 
History of the Long Island Rail Road
Long Island Rail Road Rolling Stock

References

Further reading
Vincent F. Seyfried, The Long Island Rail Road: A Comprehensive History, Part One: South Side R.R. of L.I., © 1961
Vincent F. Seyfried, The Long Island Rail Road: A Comprehensive History, Part Two: The Flushing, North Shore & Central Railroad, © 1963

External links
LIRR Station History
Unofficial LIRR History Website

 
Long Island Rail Road
Long Island
Rail